Longhua station is a station on Line 4 of the Shenzhen Metro. It opened on 16 June 2011. Line 4 was formerly named after this station (as the Longhua Line).

Station layout

Exits

References

External links
 Shenzhen Metro Longhua Station (Chinese)
 Shenzhen Metro Longhua Station (English)

Railway stations in Guangdong
Shenzhen Metro stations
Longhua District, Shenzhen
Railway stations in China opened in 2011